Sabine Barisch is a German Paralympic skier. She represented West Germany in para-alpine skiing at the 1980 Paralympic Winter Games, and 1984 Paralympic Winter Games. She won a total of six medals, including one gold medal , two silver medals and three bronze medals.

Career 
At the 1980 Winter Paralympics, Berghofer won the gold medal in the 3B slalom with a time of 1:38.23 (in 2nd place Brigitte Madlener who finished in 1:40.68 and in 3rd place Evelyn Werner in 1:45.87).  She won a silver medal in the giant slalom in 3:13.47 (on the podium, Brigitte Madlener, gold medal in 2:52.86 and Sabine Stiefbold , bronze medal in 3:15.88  ).

At the  1984 Winter Paralympics in Innsbruck, she won a silver medal in the downhill LW5 / 7 (with a realized time of 1: 27.65), and three bronze medals: in the slalom, giant slalom  and alpine super combined; all in the LW5 / 7 category.

References 

Living people
German female alpine skiers
Paralympic alpine skiers of Germany
Paralympic gold medalists for West Germany
Paralympic silver medalists for West Germany
Paralympic bronze medalists for West Germany
Alpine skiers at the 1980 Winter Paralympics
Alpine skiers at the 1984 Winter Paralympics
Medalists at the 1980 Winter Paralympics
Medalists at the 1984 Winter Paralympics
Year of birth missing (living people)